Balally is a stop on the Luas light-rail tram system in Dún Laoghaire - Rathdown, south of Dublin, Ireland.  It opened in 2004 as a stop on the Green Line and serves Dundrum Town Centre as well as the suburbs of Balally and Goatstown. The stop is located at the junction at the side of Overend Avenue.

Location and access

Balally is located in an open-air station box. On either side, the tracks run in cut and cover tunnels. To the northwest, they run under the Rockfield Central apartment block and Overend Avenue.  To the southeast, the tracks run under an internal street and an office block. The northbound platform has a staircase and a lift which lead directly to the street.  The southbound platform has a flight of steps and a ramp which lead to a mall with shops under the Rockfield development. At street level, the stop is signposted with a solar-powered totem. Similar totems are seen at some other stops on the Green Line.

Balally has a Park and Ride facility with 421 spaces, of which 9 are reserved for those with disabled badges. The car park is underground, lying beneath another car park used by a housing development. The stop is also served by Dublin Bus routes 44, 44B, and 116.

References

Luas Green Line stops in Dún Laoghaire–Rathdown